The coccygeus muscle or ischiococcygeus is a muscle of the pelvic floor, located posterior to levator ani and anterior to the sacrospinous ligament.

Structure 
The coccygeus muscle is posterior to levator ani and anterior to the sacrospinous ligament in the pelvic floor. It is a triangular plane of muscular and tendinous fibers. It arises by its apex from the spine of the ischium and sacrospinous ligament. It is inserted by its base into the margin of the coccyx and into the side of the lowest piece of the sacrum.

In combination with the levator ani, it forms the pelvic diaphragm.

The pudendal nerve runs between the coccygeus muscle and the piriformis muscle, superficial to the coccygeus muscle.

Nerve supply 
The coccygeus muscle is innervated by the pudendal nerve, which runs between it and the piriformis muscle.

Function 
The coccygeus muscle assists the levator ani and piriformis muscle in closing in the back part of the outlet of the pelvis. This helps to support the vagina in women, and the other pelvic organs.

See also
 Extensor coccygis
 Coccyx
 Coccydynia (coccyx pain, tailbone pain)
 Pubococcygeus muscle

References

External links
  - "The Female Pelvis: Muscles of the Pelvic Diaphragm"
 
 
Coccyx pain, tailbone pain, coccydynia (Peer-reviewed medical chapter, available free online at eMedicine)

Muscles of the torso